Rzeszotary  is a village in the administrative district of Gmina Świątniki Górne, within Kraków County, Lesser Poland Voivodeship, in southern Poland.

The village has an approximate population of 2,500.

References

Villages in Kraków County